Pierangela Samarati from the Università degli Studi di Milano, Italy, was named Fellow of the Institute of Electrical and Electronics Engineers (IEEE) in 2012 for contributions to information security, data protection, and privacy. She was named a 2021 ACM Fellow "for contributions to data security and privacy".

References

Fellow Members of the IEEE
Living people
Year of birth missing (living people)
Italian women engineers
Place of birth missing (living people)
Fellows of the Association for Computing Machinery